Kishen Kanhaiya is a  1990 Indian Hindi action comedy film directed by Rakesh Roshan, released in 1990. The film stars Anil Kapoor(in double role), Shilpa Shirodkar, Madhuri Dixit in lead roles. In this movie, Shilpa Shirodkar had a controversial transparent wet saree scene similar to Mandakini's scene in Ram Teri Ganga Maili and she later had to regret because of this role. This film is inspired from the 1968 film Ram Aur Shyam, which had also inspired Seeta Aur Geeta and ChaalBaaz. Before Anil Kapoor, the role was offered to Amitabh Bachchan, but he rejected it due to some reasons. The film turned out to be a "Hit" at the "Box Office".

Plot
Leela and Bholaram are a childless couple. Leela is a midwife, and one day assists Sunderdas' wife to give birth to twin boys. She decides to keep one baby for herself and tells Sunderdas that his wife has given birth to one child. There are complications for the mother, and she passes away without seeing her children.

Leela and Bholaram bring up Kanhaiya, while Sunderdas attempts to bring up Kishen, but is unable to do a good job. So he marries Kamini, who comes along with her brother, Ghendamal, to live at the estate. She has an illegitimate child named Mahesh from another man. When Sunderdas learns this, he is threatened and attacked. As a result, he is paralyzed, unable to move. Kishen is brought up by Kamini and Ghendamal with a lot of abuse and intimidation. He is kept illiterate, so that he can blindly thumbprint whatever documents he is asked to sign.

Kanhaiya is brought up to be a street-smart. fighter and movie-crazy young man. That's how he meets an equally movie-crazy, rich and spoilt girl, Anju, and they fall in love.

The one secret that ties the brothers together is their reflex action — if one is injured, the other feels the pain, too. Only Bhola makes the connection at a vital point in the story. Kishen likes Radha, a servant, and is married, but the atrocities do not stop. Finally, Gendamal asks Mahesh to kill Kishen by throwing him off a cliff after getting the property papers. At the same time, Kanhaiya learns of his past and returns to the ancestral mansion, shocking everyone. What also shocks everyone is his changed attitude. He denies his signatures on the papers signed by Kishen. Finally, all the confusions are resolved. Kishen and Kanhaiya together fight the evil and achieve justice.

Box Office
Movies budget was "2.35 cr"Rs 
and it was released on "9 March 1990". On the first day, it collected "10 lk"Rs, and on the first day it collected "1.05 cr" Rs. At India, it collected "5 cr" Rs and the worldwide collection was "8 cr "Rs. The film proved to be a "Hit" at Box Office.

Cast

Anil Kapoor as Kishen / Kanhaiya (Double Role)
Shilpa Shirodkar as Radha
Madhuri Dixit as Anju
Kader Khan as Munshi
Saeed Jaffrey as Vidyacharan
Ranjeet as Shridhar
Bindu as Kamini
Dalip Tahil as Mahesh
Amrish Puri as Gendamal
Sujit Kumar as Bholaram
Shubha Khote as Leela
Shreeram Lagoo as Sundardas
Johnny Lever as Lobo
Dinesh Hingoo as Lokhandwala
Vikas Anand as Doctor

Soundtrack

The soundtrack contains six songs. The music is composed by Rajesh Roshan, with lyrics written by Indeevar and Anwar Sagar. The album includes songs sung by top singers like Lata Mangeshkar, Asha Bhosle, Sadhana Sargam, Mohammed Aziz, Amit Kumar, Manhar Udhas and Nitin Mukesh.

References

External links

1990 films
1990s Hindi-language films
Indian romantic action films
Twins in Indian films
Films directed by Rakesh Roshan
Films scored by Rajesh Roshan
1990s masala films